The 2. Internationales ADAC 1000 Kilometer Rennen auf dem Nürburgring  took place on 27 May, on the Nürburgring Nordschleife, (West Germany).  It was also the fourth round of the F.I.A. World Sports Car Championship. This was the first time the event had taken place, since it was dropped from the championship following its inaugural event in 1953. It was also round two of the German Sportscar Championship.

Report

Entry

A grand total 71 racing cars were registered for this event, of which 61 arrived for practice and qualifying. Fresh from their domination on the Mille Miglia, came two work teams of Scuderia Ferrari, and Officine Alfieri Maserati. The team from Maranello arrived with four cars, two 860 Monzas and two 290 MMs. The pairing to beat was that of Juan Manuel Fangio and Eugenio Castellotti driving the more powerful 860 Monza. This car was powered by a 3.4 litre 4-cylinder engine, producing 280 bhp. Their Modenese rivals, who were 12 points going into the meeting need a victory to reopened the Constructors’ Championship. Do to this, their arrived with four cars, two 300Ss, plus a 350s and a 150S. Their stars drivers, headed by the young Englishman, Stirling Moss, were in the 300Ss with a smaller 3.0 litre 6-cylinder engine, but it still produced 245 bhp.

Qualifying

Qualifying was held over three sessions for a total of 1,590 minutes over the three prior to the race. The Ferrari 860 Monza of Fangio took pole position, averaging a speed of 84.534 mph around the 14.173 mile circuit. This was an incredible lap time, especially when compared to the time set by team-mate Luigi Musso, into the slower 290 MM – which was a full three seconds slower. The ’53 pole winner was on pole yet again, having given everyone a lesson on how to drive the 174 corner of the ‘Ring. When the finish session had finished, Ferrari had secured the first three places, the 300S driver by Moss and Jean Behra was fourth. The first non-Italian car was fifth, the Jaguar D-Type of Mike Hawthorn and Desmond Titterington.

Race

The day of the race would be warm and dry, with a crowd of approximately 70,000 in attendance to witness for is regarded one of Maserati’s finest ever race victory.

The start of the 1,000 kilometer race did not bode well for the Modenese marque, despite Moss taking the lead. On lap 11, after Behra had replaced Moss after the first pit stop, the rear transverse leaf spring of their 300S broke, forcing the Frenchman to the wheel of the second 300S. This was being driven by Harry Schell and Piero Taruffi, which was laying in third place at the time. Behra immediately embarked on charge back through the field to catch the leading Ferrari of Fangio and Castellotti. It was then decided by the team to put Moss into the car. At this point of the race, Moss was lying 66 seconds behind Fangio.

As soon as Moss got into the car, he began to lap the 22km circuit at a pace that no-one would match. He was lapping 4/5 seconds faster than the ‘Maestro’ Fangio. At this pace, the seemingly safe win in the hands of the Ferrari duo, suddenly was in doubt. On lap 26 of the 44 scheduled, Fangio was unhappy with his car’s handling, so he got his mechanics to check its suspension while refueling, losing about a minute in the process. Sensing the threat to his victory, Fangio delayed handed the car over to Castellotti, as long as possible, in an attempt to stave off Moss’s assault. However, the fate of the race was sealed, when the lap 40, the “Maestro” re-entered to pits for fuel, the 300S of Moss charged on towards an astounding victory.

The winning partnership of Moss/Behra/Taruffi/Schell, won in a time of 7hr 43:54.5mins., averaging a speed of 80.658 mph. The margin of triumph over the Ferrari of Fangio/Castelloti was 26 seconds, and led another Ferrari driven by Hill/De Portago/Gendebien by 10 min 01.4s. Porsche snatched fourth place with Wolfgang von Trips/Umberto Maglioli, but their 550 RS finished almost 20 minutes adrift of the Maserati. Moss’s pace was so quick that he lapped event he fifth placed Aston Martin DB3S of Peter Collins and Tony Brooks. Race did not end when Moss cross the finishing line, but continued for another hour to allow the other classes/division to try and complete the full 1000 km.

To add to Fangio’s woes, Ferrari mechanics checked his after the race and found his 860 Monza did not actually problem with its suspension, as the quirky handling had simply been caused by the wrong tyre pressures.

Official Classification

Class Winners are in Bold text.

 Fastest Lap: Juan Manuel Fangio, 10:05.2secs (84.296 mph)

Class Winners

References

Nurburgring
6 Hours of Nürburgring
Nurburgring